Irzio Luigi Magliacani OFM Cap.  (February 16, 1892 - March 15, 1976) was an Italian Bishop and Missionary who served as the Apostolic Vicar of Arabia from 23 October 1948 to 4 November 1969, he also served as the Titular Bishop of Dium. He was the last Vicar of Arabia who had his Cathedra (throne) in Aden.

Life 
In March of 1915, Magliacani was ordained to the priesthood and became Capuchin; soon after his ordination, he was transferred to Agra in 1920; as the mission in Arabia required more personnel, he was transferred to Aden in 1939. In October of 1948, right after World War 2, Pope Pius XII appointed him as the Apostolic Administrator of Arabia after the resignation of Msgr. Tirinanzi. On 25 December 1949, he was nominated as Titular Bishop of Dium and The Apostolic Vicar of Arabia. He was consecrated as a bishop by the Archbishop of Florence, Cardinal Elia Dalla Costa, in Florence on 28 May 1950. 

Magliacani was quick to assess the situation following World War 2 and fulfilled the urgent requirement for churches and personnel in Somalia, Yemen, and Bahrain; by this time in the 1950s, as the nations in the Persian Gulf were striking oil, Magliacani saw the rising prominence of the mission in Bahrain. During these years, events in South Yemen were taking a turn for the worse after the British left Aden in 1967, and Communists soon took control. 

In 1962, land was donated by the Sheikhs in the Emirates to the Catholic Church and soon St. Joseph's Church in Abu Dhabi and St. Mary's Church in Dubai were built. In the same year Magliacani attended The Second Ecumenical Council of the Vatican, he took part in all the four periods of the council as a council father.

On November 4, 1969, Irzio Luigi Maglacani resigned as Apostolic Vicar of Arabia.

Death 
He died on March 15, 1976. (presumably in Grosseto)

References 

 

1892 births
1976 deaths
20th-century Italian titular bishops
Roman Catholic bishops in the Middle East
Capuchin bishops
Catholic missionaries in Arabia
Apostolic Vicariate of Arabia
Catholic Church in the Arabian Peninsula